Richard Cracknell (1893–unknown) was an English footballer who played in the Football League for Crystal Palace.

References

1893 births
English footballers
Association football midfielders
English Football League players
Newcastle United F.C. players
Crystal Palace F.C. players
Maidstone United F.C. (1897) players
Dartford F.C. players
Year of death missing